The Surendranagar–Bhavnagar line is located in the Gujarat state of India. Some passenger trains run on this railway line.

History
The Surendranagar–Bhavnagar line was laid by Bhavnagar State Railway in 1879 and was opened by 18 December 1880.  Gauge conversion of this section was announced in Rail budget 1997. The gauge conversion foundation stone was laid by then Union Home Minister Lal Krishna Advani on 8 July 1999. Gauge conversion was sanctioned under SPV section from Surendranagar–Dhola–Pipavav in September 2000 by Indian Railway to serve Pipavav Port.
The gauge conversion of this section was completed by 2003.

References

Railway lines in Gujarat
Surendranagar district
Western Railway zone

1880 establishments in India
5 ft 6 in gauge railways in India